South Korea (IOC designation:Korea) participated in the 2003 Asian Winter Games held in Aomori, Japan from February 1, 2003 to February 8, 2003.

Medal summary

Medal table

Medalists

Gold
Curling
 Men - Lee Dong-keun, Kim Soo-hyuk, Park Jae-cheol, Choi Min-suk, Ko Seung-wan

Short track speed skating
 Men's 1000 m - Ahn Hyun-soo
 Men's 1500 m - Ahn Hyun-soo
 Men's 3000 m - Song Suk-woo
 Men's 5000 m Relay - Team Korea
 Women's 1500 m - Choi Eun-kyung

Ski jumping
 K90 (90m) Team - Kim Hyun-ki, Choi Heung-chul, Choi Yong-jik, Kang Chil-ku

Speed skating
 Men's 1000 m - Lee Kyu-hyuk
 Men's 1500 m - Lee Kyu-hyuk

Silver
Biathlon
 Men's 4 x 7.5 km Relay - Son Hae-kwon, Kim Kyung-tae, Shin Byung-kook, Park Yoon-bae

Curling
 Women - Kim Mi-yeon, Park Ji-hyun, Shin Mi-sung, Lee Hyun-jung, Park Kyung-mi

Short track speed skating
 Men's 3000 m - Lee Seung-jae
 Women's 1500 m - Cho Hae-ri
 Women's 3000 m - Choi Min-kyung

Snowboarding
 Men's Giant slalom - Ji Myung-gon

Speed skating
 Men's 1500 m - Moon Jun
 Women's 3000 m - Baek Eun-bi

Bronze
Alpine skiing
 Women's Slalom - Oh Jae-eun

Short track speed skating
 Men's 500 m - Song Suk-woo
 Men's 1500 m - Lee Seung-jae
 Women's 1000 m - Cho Hae-ri
 Women's 1500 m - Ko Gi-hyun
 Women's 3000 m - Kim Min-jee

Ski jumping
 K90 (90m) Individual - Choi Heung-chul

Snowboarding
 Men's Halfpipe - Han Jin-bae

Speed skating
 Men's 1500 m - Yeo Sang-yeop
 Women's 1500 m - Baek Eun-bi

Participation details

Alpine skiing
Men

Women

Biathlon
Men

Women

Cross-country skiing
Men

Women

Figure skating
Men

Women

Ice dancing

Ice hockey
 Men: 4th 
 Women: 5th

Ski jumping
Men

Snowboard
Men

Speed skating
Men

Women

References

Nations at the 2003 Asian Winter Games
Asian Winter Games
South Korea at the Asian Winter Games